Alessio Saro (born May 30, 1975), (also known with the name of Billy Ballo and Nick Malanno), is an Italian actor and comedian. He works in Shortcut Production performing in comedy sketches with Marcello Macchia, Enrico Venti, Luigi Luciano and Franco Mari. In May 2009 he was arrested for statutory rape and sentenced to four months in prison.

Filmography

TV Series
 Intralci, (2006)
 La Villa di Lato, (2009)
 Drammi Medicali, (2009)

References

Italian male television actors
Italian male voice actors
1975 births
Living people
Italian comedians